Samira Mighty (born 16 November 1995) is an English television personality, actress and singer. Mighty began her career with appearances in West End theatre shows including Mamma Mia! and Dreamgirls, as well as an appearance in the 2017 film Beauty and the Beast. In 2018, she appeared in the fourth series of the ITV2 reality series Love Island, and has since competed on The X Factor: Celebrity. In 2022, Mighty began releasing music.

Early life
Mighty was born on 16 November 1995 in Greenwich. As a child, Mighty attended the Young Dancers Academy in West London. She also trained at the Millennium Performing Arts College in Woolwich for three years, where she became trained in jazz, ballet, contemporary, tap and commercial dance styles, as well as singing and dancing.

Career
Mighty began her career as a West End theatre performer, making appearances in Mamma Mia!, The Nutcracker and Dreamgirls. As well as her stage credits, she appeared in the 2017 film Beauty and the Beast as a debutante. In 2018, Mighty departed from her role as an ensemble member from Dreamgirls in order to appear on the fourth series of Love Island. Her abrupt departure from Dreamgirls led to reports that she was being sued by the production company of the show, but Mighty later confirmed that her role was "easy to fill" since she was in the ensemble, and that an ex-cast member had filled the role. On her fortieth day of Love Island, she walked from the series.

Months after her exit from Love Island, Mighty was announced as the host of the Facebook Watch game show, Confetti. In 2019, it was announced that Mighty would be competing in the ITV competition series The X Factor: Celebrity. She revealed that at the age of fifteen, she unsuccessfully auditioned for the regular edition of the series. In the celebrity series, she was part of a group called No Love Lost, alongside fellow Love Island cast members Zara McDermott, Eyal Booker and Wes Nelson; Mighty acted as the lead singer of the group. After finishing in eighth place, Mighty confirmed that she had left the group, and that she was working on her own music. In July 2022, she released her debut single, a cover of "I Love Your Smile". She has also confirmed that more music will be released later in the year.

Filmography

References

External links
 

1996 births
21st-century English actresses
Actresses from London
English stage actresses
Living people
Television personalities from London
The X Factor (British TV series) contestants
Love Island (2015 TV series) contestants